The Interview Islands is a group of islands located in Austin Harbour and Interview sound.
These islands belong to the Andaman Islands.  They belong to the North and Middle Andaman administrative district, part of the Indian union territory of Andaman and Nicobar Islands.

Geography
The main islands are Interview Island, Anderson Island, Murga Island, and South Reef Island. Other islands include Bennett Island.

Administration
Politically, Interview Group Islands are part of Mayabunder Taluk.

Demographics 
There is only 1 village, located on the eastern part of Interview Island.

References 

 Geological Survey of India

 
Archipelagoes of the Andaman and Nicobar Islands
North and Middle Andaman district
Tourist attractions in the Andaman and Nicobar Islands